Kiyoshi Toyoda (豊田 清, born February 2, 1971) is a Japanese professional baseball player.

External links

1971 births
Living people
Baseball people from Mie Prefecture
Japanese baseball players
Seibu Lions players
Yomiuri Giants players
Hiroshima Toyo Carp players
Japanese baseball coaches
Nippon Professional Baseball coaches